Qaya (also Apsheronskiy Port and Port Apsheronskiy) is a village in Baku, Azerbaijan.

References 

Populated places in Baku